Sakar Sar is a mountain peak located at 6,272 metres (20,577 ft) above sea level. It lies in the Hindu Kush-Karakoram, in part in the Gilgit-Baltistan region of Pakistan-administered Kashmir and in part in Afghanistan's Wakhan Corridor. 

The first successful ascent was completed by a Japanese team in August 1999.

Location
Sakar Sar is located 9 km east of the Irshad Pass on the watershed between Wachandarja in the north and Chapursan in the south. The dominance reference point is a 6610  m high mountain in the Karakoram, 2.26 km east of the Koz Sar (6677  m) is located. Also, a few kilometers away is Dilisang Pass, a historic and disused cross-border trading route connecting Kyrgyz people and Wakhi people settlements.

First ascent 
On August 13, 1999; A Japanese team consisting of Akira Miyazawa, Makoto Ishikawa, Kanji Kamei, and Teruaki Suzuki and the two carriers reached the summit.

References 

Mountains of Afghanistan
Mountains of Pakistan
Mountains of Gilgit-Baltistan
Mountains of the Hindu Kush